This article lists the administrators of occupied Serbia during World War I, which represented the Central Powers of World War I in Austro-Hungarian occupied Serbia and Bulgarian occupied Serbia from late 1915 to November 1918.

Officeholders

Austro-Hungarian zone 

Military Governors
Source:

Civilian Commissioners
Source:

Bulgarian zone 
Commanders of the Moravian Military Inspection Oblast  
Source:

Commanders of the Macedonian Military Inspection Oblast  
Source:

See also 

 Austro-Hungarian occupation of Serbia
 Bulgarian occupation of Serbia
 Military General Governorate of Serbia
 Serbian campaign

References 

Administrators Of Occupied Serbia during WWI
Administrators Of Occupied Serbia during WWI
Occupied Serbia during WWI, Administrators
Occupied Serbia during WWI, Administrators
Austro-Hungarian occupation of Serbia during World War I
Bulgarian occupation of Serbia during World War I
World War I